Mareyada Manikya (Kannada: ಮರೆಯದ ಮಾಣಿಕ್ಯ) is a 1985 Indian Kannada film,  directed by  Vijay and produced by Sharada. The film stars Vishnuvardhan, K. R. Vijaya, Geetha and Dheerendra Gopal in the lead roles. The film has musical score by Shankar–Ganesh.

Cast

Vishnuvardhan
K. R. Vijaya
Geetha
Dheerendra Gopal
Sundar Krishna Urs
Sathish
N. S. Rao
Ravichandra
Rajanand
Chethan Ramarao
Vedaprada
Shanthamma
Padmaja
Baby Rekha
Negro Johnny
Shani Mahadevappa
Suryakumar
Somanna
Jorge
Hari

Soundtrack

Reception

References

External links
 

1985 films
1980s Kannada-language films
Films scored by Shankar–Ganesh
Films directed by Vijay (director)